The 2011 Coca-Cola 600, the 52nd running of the event, was a NASCAR Sprint Cup Series motor race held on May 29, 2011, at Charlotte Motor Speedway in Concord, North Carolina. Contested over 400 laps on the 1.5-mile (2.4 km) asphalt quad-oval, it was the twelfth race of the 2011 Sprint Cup Series season. The race was won by Kevin Harvick for the Richard Childress Racing team. David Ragan finished second, and Joey Logano clinched third.

There were 14 cautions and 38 lead changes among 19 different drivers throughout the course of the race. The result moved Harvick to the second position in the Drivers' Championship. He remained 36 points behind first place driver Carl Edwards and one ahead of Jimmie Johnson in third. In the Manufacturers' Championship, Chevrolet was first with 83 points, six ahead of Ford. Toyota was third with 64 points, 24 points ahead of Dodge.

Report

Background 
Charlotte Motor Speedway is one of ten intermediate to hold NASCAR races. The track's turns are banked at twenty-four degrees, while the front stretch, the location of the finish line, is five degrees. The back stretch, opposite of the front, also had a five degree banking. The racetrack has seats for 140,000 spectators.

Before the race, Ford driver Carl Edwards led the Drivers' Championship with 416 points; Chevrolet driver Jimmie Johnson was second with 392 points, 24 points behind Edwards. Kyle Busch followed in third with 379 points, 15 ahead of Dale Earnhardt Jr. and 17 ahead of Kevin Harvick in fourth and fifth. Matt Kenseth with 342 was two points ahead of Ryan Newman in seventh. Clint Bowyer, Kurt Busch and Tony Stewart rounded out the top ten positions. In the Manufacturers' Championship, Chevrolet was leading with 74 points, three points ahead of Ford. Toyota, with 60 points, was 37 points ahead of Dodge in the battle for third. Kurt Busch was the race's defending champion.

The Coca-Cola 600 was conceived by race car driver Curtis Turner, who built the Charlotte Motor Speedway. It was first held in 1960 in an attempt by NASCAR to stage a Memorial Day weekend race to compete with the open-wheel Indianapolis 500; the two races were held together on the same day starting from 1974. The race is the longest in terms of distance on the NASCAR calendar and is considered by several drivers to be one of the sport's most important races alongside the Daytona 500, the Brickyard 400 and the Southern 500. The long distance makes it the most physically demanding event in NASCAR, and teams adapt to changing track conditions because the race occurs between late afternoon and evening. It was known as the World 600 until 1984 when The Coca-Cola Company purchased the naming rights to the race and renamed it the Coca-Cola World 600 in 1985. It has been called the Coca-Cola 600 every year since 1986 except for 2002 when the name changed to Coca-Cola Racing Family 600.

Entry list

Practice and qualifying 
Three practice sessions were held before the race; the first on Thursday, which lasted 90 minutes. The second and third were both on Saturday. The first Saturday practice lasted 45 minutes, while the second lasted 60. Jeff Burton was quickest with a time of 28.635 seconds in the first session, 0.084 seconds faster than Edwards. Johnson was just off Edwards' pace, followed by Denny Hamlin, Ryan Newman, and Brad Keselowski. Kasey Kahne was seventh, still within a second of Burton's time.

Forty-eight cars were entered for qualifying, but only forty-three could qualify for the race because of NASCAR's qualifying procedure. Keselowski clinched the second pole position of his career, with a time of 28.112 seconds. He was joined on the front row of the grid by A. J. Allmendinger. Edwards qualified third, Hamlin took fourth, and Burton started fifth. Johnson, David Reutimann, David Ragan, Ricky Stenhouse Jr. and Clint Bowyer rounded out the top ten. The five drivers that failed to qualify for the race were Andy Lally, T. J. Bell, Scott Wimmer, Tony Raines, and Scott Riggs. Once the qualifying session completed, Keselowski commented, "It’s an important weekend for Penske Racing and an important weekend for the country. The 600 is a big race for NASCAR, it has a lot of tradition and to add my name to the list of pole winners is pretty special but I’d like to add it to those who have won it. This is the first step to doing that."

In the second practice session, Paul Menard was fastest with a time of 28.610 seconds, less than six-hundredths of a second quicker than second-placed Kurt Busch. Earnhardt Jr. took third place, ahead of Hamlin, Kahne and Mark Martin. In the third and final practice, Reutimann was quickest with a time of 29.271 seconds. Marcos Ambrose followed in second, ahead of Menard and Kyle Busch. Burton was fifth quickest, with a time of 29.385 seconds. Hamlin, Greg Biffle, Martin Truex Jr., Kurt Busch, and Ragan rounded out the top ten positions.

Race
The race, the twelfth in the season, began at 6:00 p.m. EDT and was televised live in the United States on Fox. Jim Daly, president of Focus on the Family, began pre-race ceremonies, by giving the invocation. Capitol Nashville recording artist Darius Rucker performed the national anthem. Then, John Falkenbury, President of the USO, Master Sergeant Spanky Gibson, Gene Gibson and Mary Gibson gave the command for drivers to start their engines.

Keselowski retained his pole position lead through the first lap. By the end of the following lap, Edwards moved to up to second, as Clint Bowyer moved up to the eighth position. On the same lap, Stenhouse Jr. collided into the wall, but sustained minor damage. Two laps later, Mike Skinner also collided into the wall. On the eighth lap, Edwards passed Keselowski to become the leader of the race. One lap later, Burton moved up to fourth, as Stenhouse Jr. reported no damage to his car resulting from the collision. At lap 12, Jeff Gordon moved up three positions to eighth, while Skinner retired from the race. Three laps later, Reutimann moved up to sixth after passing Johnson. On the 19th lap, Truex Jr. moved to twelfth. On the 24th lap, Allmendinger passed Keselowski to move to the second position. Six laps later, Biffle reported that the cool box (air conditioning box) would have to be replaced during their first pit stop. By the 37th lap, Edwards had a 2.6 second lead over Allmendinger.

On the 42nd lap, Jamie McMurray pitted, as Burton moved up to the third position. On the following lap, Reutimann and Truex Jr. pitted, one lap before Allmendinger. Two laps later, Johnson, Gordon, and Earnhardt Jr. pitted, as Edwards took the lead. Once the pit stop session completed, Edwards was the leader, ahead of Allmendinger and Kenseth. On the following lap, Hamlin passed Kenseth to take the third position. Johnson passed Keselowski to take over the fifth position at the 57th lap. On lap 60, Earnhardt Jr. passed Gordon to move up into tenth. By the 63rd lap, Edwards had expanded his lead over Allmendinger to 2.7 seconds. Six laps later, Earnhardt Jr. moved up to the eighth position, as Edwards continued to expand his over Allmendinger to 4.4 seconds. On the 74th lap, the first caution was given because of debris on the track. During the caution, most of the race leaders pitted. At the lap 79 restart, Burton was the leader, ahead of Edwards, Hamlin, Kenseth and Johnson.

On the following lap, Hamlin passed Edwards to take over the second position, one lap before he would pass Burton to become the leader. On the 82nd lap, Johnson moved up to third after passing Edwards. Two laps later, Johnson passed Burton to take over the second position, as Robby Gordon drove to the garage. On lap 85, Kenseth moved up to the third position. Burton, who restarted in the first position, had fallen to the ninth position by the 89th lap. Three laps later, Earnhardt Jr. moved up to the sixth position. Afterwards, McMurray passed Jeff Gordon to take over tenth. Five laps later, the second caution period began after Bobby Labonte spun sideways. Most of the race leaders decided to pit during the caution. At the lap 103 restart, Ragan became the leader, ahead of Reutimann and Juan Pablo Montoya in second and third. One lap later, Montoya passed Reutimann to move to the second position, a lap before Kenseth, who restarted fifth, overtook Montoya to take the position.

On the 108th lap, Kenseth passed Ragan to move into the first position. Four laps later, Edwards passed Montoya to claim the fourth position, as Kyle Busch passed Reutimann for ninth. By lap 125, Kenseth had a 3.7 second lead over Hamlin. Thirteen laps later, Edwards passed Hamlin to take over the second position, as Kyle Busch moved up to ninth. On lap 145, Reutimann pitted, marking the beginning of the pit stop session. The session lasted four laps, and Kenseth remained the leader ahead of Edwards. On lap 151, Ambrose moved up to the fourth position after passing Ragan. On the 160th, Kurt Busch reported a loose wheel, and immediately pitted. Eight laps later, McMurray moved up to the eighth position. On lap 171, the third caution period began because of debris on the track. During the caution, most of the race leaders pitted. At the lap 175 restart, Ambrose became the leader, ahead of McMurray and Montoya. In the next two laps, McMurray moved to first, while Kenseth took over the second position. On lap 181, Kenseth reclaimed the first position from McMurray, one lap before McMurray's engine failed to cause the fourth caution. After the restart, the fifth caution was given after Casey Mears and Landon Cassill collided.

At the lap 193 restart, Kenseth remained the leader ahead of Ambrose. On the following lap, Ambrose took the lead from Kenseth, but would fall to second after he retook the position on lap 199. By lap 213, Kenseth had a 2.5 second lead over Ambrose, as Johnson moved up to 11th. Eight laps later, Harvick pitted, two laps before Ambrose and three before Edwards. On lap 133, the sixth caution was given after Mike Bliss stalled his car. Most of the race leaders pitted during the caution. At the lap 240 restart, Ambrose was the leader, as Menard collided into the wall to cause the seventh caution. Five laps later, the Ambrose restarted in the first position. On the 250th lap, Earnhardt Jr. passed Johnson to take over the fifth position. Seven laps later, Kenseth moved up to the seventh position. Kenseth continued to move up, passing Hamlin for third by lap 275.

Three laps later, another pit stop session began, as Ragan pitted. Pit stops continued until the caution was given for debris on lap 282. At the lap 287 restart, Kyle Busch was the leader ahead of Ambrose and Ragan. Two laps later, the ninth caution was given because David Starr collided into the wall. Two laps after the restart, the tenth caution was given after Cassill ran through the grass on the front straightaway. During the caution, Hamlin pitted to replace a carburetor. At the lap 301 restart, Kyle Busch continued to lead as Martin, Newman, and Gilliland collided into each other, causing the 11th caution. Most of the race leaders pitted during the caution, as Jeff Gordon became the leader.

On the 314th lap, Biffle moved up to the seventh position, as Logano and Stenhouse Jr. collided into the wall, but sustained minor damage. Four laps later, the 12th caution was given after Kyle Busch spun sideways. Some of the race leaders decided to pit during the caution. However, Kahne, Harvick, and Earnhardt Jr. didn't pit and became the race leaders on the restart. On lap 328, Earnhardt Jr. reclaimed the third position from Biffle. Two laps later, Biffle passed Earnhardt Jr. for third, but lost the position to Harvick on the same lap. On the 333rd lap, Johnson moved up to the ninth position, as Keselowski moved up to fifth. Seven laps later, Ambrose made an unscheduled pit stop. Three laps later, the 13th caution was given after Kyle Busch spun for the second time. After pit stops, Gordon was the leader on the restart, as Kyle Busch drove to the garage. On lap 351, Biffle became the leader after passing Gordon.

Four laps later, Gordon lost another position after being passed by Kahne. Afterwards, Gordon continued to lose positions as Ragan passed him on lap 360. Three laps later, Hamlin claimed the fifth position after passing Kenseth. Thirteen laps later, Earnhardt Jr. moved up to the third position, as Kenseth moved to fourth after passing Ragan. With seven laps remaining, Kenseth and Gordon pitted for fuel. On lap 396, Johnson's engine failed, causing the 14th caution. Biffle also pitted during the caution, while Kahne tried to race without refueling. At the lap 400 restart, Kahne was the leader, but was passed by Earnhardt Jr. one lap later. On the final lap, Earnhardt Jr. was able to drive to the fourth turn before running out of fuel. Harvick passed Earnhardt Jr. (who would drop to seventh) to win his third race of the season, ahead of Ragan and Logano.

Post-race

Harvick appeared in victory lane after his victory lap to start celebrating his third win of the season, in front of a crowd of 145,000 people. The race also became the longest in NASCAR history (at the time) after being extended by two laps. "Today we were lucky. We didn’t have a spectacular night, but to be in victory lane says a lot about this Budweiser team. I griped and griped and griped all day about how terrible it [the car] was," said Harvick of his triumph.

Although Earnhardt Jr. was leading the race on the final lap, Harvick passed him after he ran out of fuel in the final corner. Earnhardt Jr., who finished seventh, said, "We weren't supposed to make it. We run out of gas and kind of knew it. We played our hand. I tried to save a ton of gas. I know I didn't save enough but as much as I could." He continued, "I'm disappointed we didn't win. I know all our fans are disappointed to come so close. But if we'd have won that race, it'd have been a gift.

At Harvick's press conference after the race, Harvick gave a speech about how bad he felt for Earnhardt Jr. and Harvick's car owner, Richard Childress commented, "We all want to see Dale Junior win, but not at our expense. When I saw him come down the backstretch [on the last lap], I said, 'Dale is going to win this race.' Then I heard our spotter start screaming [about Junior running out of fuel]. I said, 'We’re going to win it – great.' " The race result moved Harvick into the second position in the Drivers' Championship standings with 409 points, 36 points behind Edwards and one ahead of Johnson in the third position. Earnhardt Jr. and Kyle Busch followed in fourth and fifth with 402 and 392 points. Chevrolet maintained their lead in the Manufacturers' Championship with 83 points. Ford and Toyota placed second and third with 77 and 64 points, while Dodge was fourth with 40. 10.1 million people watched the race on television. The race took four hours, thirty-three minutes and fourteen seconds to complete, and the margin of victory was 0.703 seconds.

Results

Qualifying

Race results

Standings after the race

Drivers' Championship standings

Manufacturers' Championship standings

Note: Only the top five positions are included for the driver standings.

References

Coca-Cola 600
Coca-Cola 600
NASCAR races at Charlotte Motor Speedway
May 2011 sports events in the United States